The 2012 Washington wildfires were a series of 1,342 wildfires that burned  over the course of 2012. The fires primarily occurred in the Okanogan and Wenatchee National Forests during September and October 2012. A severe lightning storm on September 8 caused hundreds of fires across the east side of Cascade Range.  Smoke caused hazardous air quality conditions in the cities of Ellensburg and Wenatchee, and was noticeable in Seattle.  The cost of fighting the largest four fires was estimated to be $67.5 million.

Taylor Bridge Fire

The first major wildfire in Washington during the 2012 season started on August 13 east of Cle Elum between Interstate 90 and U.S. Route 97 in Kittitas County.  The fire was fully contained on August 28 after burning  acres and destroying 61 homes.  The cause of the fire is under investigation, but is suspected to be construction work.

September 8 lightning-strike fires

Okanogan Complex – . Three fires in the lower Methow River valley, on either side of State Route 153 in Okanogan County.
Wenatchee Complex – . The largest fires were south of U.S. Route 2 near the city of Wenatchee mainly in Chelan County.  Other fires in the complex were in the upper Entiat and Wenatchee River drainages.
Byrd Fire – 
Canyon Fire – .  Located less than a mile west of the city of Wenatchee in Number 1 and Number 2 canyons.
Cashmere Fire – .  Located south of Icicle Creek extending into the Alpine Lakes Wilderness.
Peavine Canyon Fire – .  The Peavine Canyon Fire grew to become contiguous with the Table Mountain Fire to the south.
Poison Canyon Fire – 
Table Mountain Fire – . Located east of U.S. Route 97 near Blewett Pass in Kittitas County, the Table Mountain Fire threatened homes and historic structures near Liberty, Washington.  The fire grew to become contiguous with the Peavine Canyon Fire to the north.
Yakima Complex – . Approximately 75 small fires in Kittitas and Yakima counties.  The Wild Rose Fire was the largest and is located north of U.S. Route 12 and east of Rimrock Lake.
Cascade Creek Fire – . Located on the south and west slopes of Mount Adams in the Gifford Pinchot National Forest, including part of the Mount Adams Wilderness. Skamania and Yakima counties.

Other fires

Goat Fire – . Human-caused fire began on September 16, located south of State Route 153 and west of U.S. Route 97 in Okanogan County.

References

External links
  InciWeb information for Washington state

Wildfires in Washington (state) by year
Washington (state) wildfires
wildfires